YUP (Yhdistyneet Urbaanit Puoskarit, literal translation United Urban Quacks, originally Y.U.P. Young Urban Perverts) is a Finnish rock-music group. The band arose amongst three students of the Savonlinna senior high of arts in 1987 and played some rather primitive, progressive hard-core punk with English lyrics. Originally the group consisted of Jarkko Martikainen (guitar), Valtteri Tynkkynen (bass guitar) and Jussi Hyyrynen (drums).

With the EP Turpasauna in 1990 the language changed into Finnish and the music became more complicated. Soon a fourth member joined the band, keyboardist Tommi Kärkkäinen, since more musicians were needed to carry out the varied ideas of the artists. In 1992 on the single Daavidin fuzz / Paratiisin sahakielet the crew had changed again: Jussi Hyyrynen had switched to the guitar and Janne Mannonen had been hired to be the new drummer. The current form of YUP dates back to 1994 when  the keyboardist was changed to Petri Tiainen after the album Toppatakkeja ja Toledon terästä. Tommi Kärkkäinen begun to compose classical music.

The album Outo elämä from 1998 is widely considered the breakthrough of YUP. After that the music has become somewhat lighter and easier to approach, which has upset some hard-core fans. Their compilation album reflects this trend, the album being called Helppoa kuunneltavaa 2004 ("Easy Listening"), accompanied by the DVD Helppoa katseltavaa ("Easy Watching") and the songbooks Helppoa soiteltavaa ("Easy Playing") and Helppoa soiteltavaa II ("Easy Playing II").

The band's eleventh studio album, Vapauden kaupungit, was released June 21, 2008. In 2009, the band announced that it would go on an indefinite hiatus.

Lineup
 Jarkko Martikainen - vocals, guitar
 Valtteri Tynkkynen - bass guitar
 Jussi Hyyrynen - guitar
 Janne Mannonen - drums
 Petri Tiainen - keyboards

Discography

Albums
 The Hippos From Hell (1989)
 Huuda harkiten (1991)
 Toppatakkeja ja Toledon terästä (1994)
 Homo Sapiens (1994)
 Yövieraat (1996)
 Outo elämä (1998)
 Normaalien maihinnousu (1999)
 Lauluja metsästä (2001)
 Leppymättömät (2003)
 Keppijumppaa (2005)
 Vapauden kaupungit (2008)

EPs
 Who Dares Farts (1989)
 Whlap-Zap Ninja (1989)
 Turpasauna (1990)
 Julmasti juhlallista (1991)
 Minä olen myyrä (1993)
 Me viihdytämme teitä (1999)
 Minä en tiedä mitään (2005)
 Maailmannäyttely (2008)

Singles
 Daavidin Fuzz/Paratiisin sahakielet (1992)
 Jumala halkaisi ihmisen kahtia (1994)
 Homo Sapiens (1995)
 Porvariston hillitty charmi (1996)
 Tavaroiden taikamaailma (1997)
 Tuuliajolla (1998)
 Mitä luoja teki ennen kuin loi maailman? (1998)
 Meitä odotellaan mullan alla (1999)
 Varjoleikit (1999)
 Pohjaton säkki (2000)
 Ihana elämä (2001)
 Rakkaus on pesti hulluuteen (2001)
 Joutilas (2003)
 Pahassa paikassa (2003)
 Päivä kerrallaan (2004)
 Intiaanit ymmärtävät (2005)

Compilations
 1990-1992 (1992)
 Hajota ja hallitse 1993-2001 (2001)
 The Hippos From Hell & Other Oddities 1988-1990 (2003)
 Helppoa kuunneltavaa (2004)

Other published works

Books
 Helppoa soiteltavaa (Like, 2004)
 Helppoa soiteltavaa II (Like, 2005)

DVDs
 Helppoa katseltavaa (2004)

External links
Official site

Finnish progressive rock groups